José Luis Vargas (born 7 November 1991) is a Bolivian professional footballer who last played for Club Blooming in the Bolivian Primera División.

International career
On June 3, 2017 Vargas started for the senior Bolivia national football team in a 1–0 win against the Nicaragua national football team. Vargas scored his first goal for Bolivia in his second game, again against Nicaragua, scoring a late winner in a 3-2 win at the Estadio Provincial, Yacuiba.

References

1991 births
Living people
Bolivian footballers
Association football midfielders
Bolivia international footballers
Club Blooming players